Nicolás Jarry defeated Tomás Martín Etcheverry in the final, 6–7(5–7), 7–6(7–5), 6–2 to win the singles tennis title at the 2023 Chile Open.

Pedro Martínez was the defending champion, but lost in the first round to Yannick Hanfmann.

Seeds
The top four seeds received a bye into the second round.

Draw

Finals

Top half

Bottom half

Qualifying

Seeds

Qualifiers

Lucky loser
  Carlos Taberner

Qualifying draw

First qualifier

Second qualifier

Third qualifier

Fourth qualifier

References

External links
Main draw
Qualifying draw

Chile Open - Singles
2023 Singles